William Madison Taylor III (born March 29, 1981) is an American singer, songwriter, and record producer. He is best known as a contestant from MTV's Making the Band 4, where he was chosen by Diddy to be a member and one of the main vocalists of the band Day26 on August 26, 2007.

Early life
Taylor was a member of the Chicago-based group Kwiet Storm. Their music video, "Leave Me Alone", appeared on BET's Midnight Love, Cita's World, Hits from the Street, and as a New Joint of the Day on 106 & Park. After ten years with Kwiet Storm, Taylor left to start a solo career.

Taylor has worked with well-known artists such as Avant (with whom he co-wrote two songs on Director: "So Many Ways" and "With You"), Ginuwine, Jagged Edge, and Joe.

Career

Making the Band 4 and Love & Hip Hop: Hollywood
After leaving "Kwiet Storm" Taylor began a solo career, putting his first album on hold to audition for Making The Band 4. The second season of Making The Band 4 revolved around Day26, Danity Kane, and Donnie Klang competing to see who can make a better album. In the season finale Diddy announced that Making The Band 4 would have another season. This time it would revolve around Danity Kane, Day26, and Donnie Klang touring. He premiered the video for his new single "Sex Conversation" from his mixtape Sex Tape. A new Day26 album titled Forever in a Day was released in April 2009. He is also the CEO of Noivak Music Group.

On September 7, 2015,  Taylor, his wife Lashanda and two children were featured on the second season of the VH1 spin-off show Love & Hip Hop: Hollywood.

Discography

With Kwiet Storm 
2004: In The Mist Of The Storm

Solo album 
2006: On My Way

Solo Projects 
2010: Sextape
2012: The Re-Introduction of Willie Taylor
2014: "Sextape 2"

Singles 
"What I Need" (2006)
"Sweat" (2006)
"Pushin Beauty" (2006)
"Sex Conversation" (2010)
"Blast Off" (2014)
"Though I Knew Myself" (2015) 
"Jackpot" (2016)

Guest appearances

Filmography
Note to Self 2012

Television

References 

1981 births
Living people
American contemporary R&B singers
Participants in American reality television series
21st-century American singers